Ankothrips yuccae is a species of thrip in the family Melanthripidae. Its host plant is Yucca whipplei.

Description
Both sexes are winged, with light brown to brown body, legs and antennae, with antennal segments 3-4 paler and forewings fuscous with its base a little bit paler. Its antennae has nine segments, the ninth longer the eight, sensoria transverse on  the third- fourth, the second segment apex prolonged ventro-laterally into serrate lobe. Head with ocellar setae I arising on conical, slightly bifurcate tubercle, the third setae arise within ocellar triangle. It hears with 3 pairs of prominent postocular setae and the pronotum posterior margin with 5 pairs of prominent setae. Mesonotum has  microtrichia, Metanotum striate medially, with median setae near posterior margin. The 8th abdominal tergite median setae scarcely 0.3 as long as tergite; tergite 10  with paired trichobothria well developed. Sixth sternite posterior margin with pair of lobes each bearing two setae at base.

Ecology
Ankothrips yuccae breeds on Yucca whipplei  without leaving major harm in California. It has no known vectors.

References

Insects described in 1926
Thrips